Béja Governorate is one of the twenty-four governorates of Tunisia. It is in northern Tunisia and has a brief coastline relative to its size. It covers an area of 3,740 km² and had a population of 303,032 as at the 2014 census. The capital is Béja and it spans the moderately high Tell Atlas hills and part of the plain between the Tell Atlas and the Dorsal Atlas further south.

Geography 

The average temperature is 18 °C and annual rainfall is 350-1000 millimeters.

Administrative divisions
Administratively, the governorate is divided into nine delegations (mutamadiyat), eight municipalities, eight rural councils, and 101 sectors (imadas). The delegations and their populations from the 2004 and 2014 censuses, are listed below:

The following eight municipalities are located in Béja Governorate:

References

 
Governorates of Tunisia